Incredibox is a music video game, developed and published by the French company So Far So Good (SFSG). The concept of the game is users dragging and dropping sound icons on different characters to make music. The player can find combos to unlock animated bonuses and record mixes to integrate a ranking. An automatic mode is also available to generate an endless composition of randomness.

Gameplay 
Incredibox is a music-making app in which the user can create a mix by managing a group of seven animated beatboxers. Once one of the available versions (or musical styles) has been chosen, the player is provided with an interface made up of seven blank characters and twenty sound icons. These icons are divided into the following categories (five for each of them): beats, effects, melodies and voices. Each icon is a unique acappella sound loop to drag-and-drop onto the characters (which represents the musical composer in all versions) from a range of hats, sunglasses, masks, headphones or other items that dress them as they are used and let them sing in rhythm with each other. To fine-tune a mix, the player can also swap out new sounds, mute sounds, do a solo on one of them, find combos to unlock animated bonuses and record all those interactions to share it on social media via an URL. Then contributors can listen and vote their favorite tracks all the way to the Top 50 chart of Incredibox. For users who just want to listen to an endless mix, an automatic mode can play loops of each version at random.

Versions 
There are different versions of Incredibox in the game that the players can choose from. Each version has a musical style with a unique theme to it. The first four versions can be played both on the official Incredibox website demo and on the paid apps. While the renaming versions of the game are exclusive, and they can only be played on the paid apps.

 Alpha is the first version of Incredibox that was released on June 2018. The theme is inspired by old school beatbox. This is a remastered version of the online flash game that was originally released on the Incredibox website back in 2009.
 Little Miss is the second version of Incredibox that was released on March 2012. This theme is inspired by R&B Music. This version kept the same monochromatic color scheme as they did in the first version.
 Sunrise is the third version of Incredibox that was released on October 2013. This theme is inspired by pop music. It was the first version of the game to add colors to categories on their items and outfits to the characters. It features green beats, blue effects, red melodies, and yellow voices.
 The Love is the fourth version of Incredibox that was released on November 2014. This theme is inspired by French house. This version features yellow beats, sky blue effects, red melodies, and purple voices.

 Brazil is the fifth version of Incredibox that was released on May 2016. It's the first version to be made exclusively for the paid apps. This theme is inspired by Brazilian music. This version features yellow beats, blue effects, green voices, and red melodies.
 Alive is the sixth version of Incredibox that was released on March 2018. This theme is inspired by Japanese culture, with music of modern rap/hip hop/trap music. This version features blue beats, purple effects, red melodies, and orange voices.
 Jeevan is the seventh version of Incredibox that was released on June 2019. This theme is inspired by traditional Indian music. This version features orange beats, red effects, blue melodies, and green voices.
 Dystopia is the eighth version of Incredibox that was released on December 2020. This theme is inspired by Cyberpunk culture. This version only features dark slate gray and orange colors on their items and outfits.
 V9 is the upcoming ninth version of Incredibox that will soon be released in 2023. This theme is inspired by 90s Hip hop music.

Development History
In 2006, three French friends from Saint-Étienne, Allan Durand, (director / developer) Romain Delambily, (graphic designer) and Paul Malburet, (musician & composer, known as Incredible Polo) wanted to mix their skills to create an interactive experience about music. So the team worked on this idea for several months. They made the project they needed using computer programs from scratch, such as graphic design, music, game design, code, animation, etc. After many days and nights, they finally finished the game, Incredibox, and release it online on August 16, 2009 as a Flash game for web browser. The flash game has five categories; Instruments, Percussion, Effects, Voice, and Chorus. The animated bonuses appears automatically, when the player is constantly drag-and-drops symbols onto the characters. During the following year, the flash game has gotten a lot of visitors from all around the world, with really cool recognitions and very good feedback from users.

In July 2011, the team decided to set up their French company, So Far So Good, which specialized in graphic design and multimedia to continue to develop their idea and "try to transform Incredibox into a professional project" as it is explained by Allan (also director of SFSG) in a video interview. They decided to work half time on creative projects for customers and half time on Incredibox. The team set up the Incredibox's web page and begin going into development of a new version of Incredibox, which became more revolutionary and completely changed the design and mechanics of the game. They launched a second version of Incredibox (Little Miss) in March 2012, a third one (Sunrise) in October 2013, and a fourth one (The Love) in November 2014. Each version integrating with new sounds, new character designs and new features like a recording mode, allowing users to share their mix via an URL, or by adding colors on characters and unique accessories to better identify each sound.

On March 27, 2016, SFSG have released a iOS mobile app of the game only for the iPad. To go along with the new mobile app's release, they created a new exclusive fifth version for the app, Brazil. The iOS app was then updated on September 19, so that now it runs both on the iPad and on the iPhone. The game was made available to Android users and released on Google Play on December 15, 2017. On March 5, 2018, a new exclusive sixth version, Alive was added to the mobile apps. On June 26, a remastered version of the original flash game was released on the Incredibox website under the new name, Alpha. This new remake kept the same elements from the original flash game, but with new improved sound and design of the original characters and bonuses. It was added to the mobile apps on September 26. A desktop version of the game was published for the Mac App Store on November 15, and for the Microsoft Store on December 5.

On March 18, 2019, the Incredibox website has been updated with a new interface, revised design and fresh new gameplay. The website now features a demo version of the game with the same layout as they did with the paid apps, but users can only play the first four versions. The Top 50 chart has can also be viewed on the website showcasing all versions, including the exclusive versions, by many app users all over the world. On June 24, a new exclusive seventh version, Jeevan was added to the apps. On September 20, both SFSG & Incredible Polo released a digital music album called Incredibox: 10th Anniversary. This album is a remastered collection of all the 7 versions of Incredibox, celebrating its 10th anniversary. A limited edition 12" Vinyl was released on November 25, while a physical CD was released on December 11. On December 1, 2020, a new exclusive eighth version, Dystopia was added to the apps. A remastered music single of Dystopia was released by SFSG & Incredible Polo on March 11, 2021. The game was made available on Steam on April 30. At the same time, they created an exclusive short film of the whole Dystopia story, with a brand new soundtrack & sound FX, different than from the game, and was released on Incredibox's YouTube page.

As of July 2, 2021, the Incredibox app has reached 1 million sales across all stores. On September 6, Incredibox announced a new music album from SFSG & Incredible Polo called Incredibox: The Unreleased. This album of 9 tracks was made during many of the Incredibox's demo phases. The digital album was released on October 1, while the physical CD including the limited edition 12" Vinyl was released February 1, 2022. On January 1, 2022 Incredibox announced a special new service called Incredibox for Schools. This education version of the game is designed for schools in which students and teachers can use via directly from the internet.

On June 1, Incredibox announced the 1st teaser for the 9th version of its product through all their social media. The posts contained a sketch of a potential Incredibox sound design.

On September 16, Incredibox posted the 2nd teaser for the 9th version through all their social media. The post contained vocals and kick, with muted sounds with their filenames.

On October 7th, Incredibox posted the 3rd teaser for the 9th version through all their social media. The post contained a new  sketch of a potential Incredibox sound design.

On December 23rd, Incredibox posted another teaser for the 9th version through all their social media. The post contained new sounds & characters to possibly be added to the 9th version.

Reception 
In 2009, shortly after its launch on web browser, Incredibox was featured on the FWA (Favorite Website Awards) as "Site of the Day" on September 15 and later FWA's founder Rob Ford announced that "this site will give you that coolness you have always desired" in a newsletter from Adobe in December.

In 2012, the updated web page with Incredibox 2.0 (later known as Little Miss) became instantly popular, that, after 600,000 visits in one day, the server crashed on April 13. During this week, the word "Incredibox" was the search term with "the most significant growth worldwide", as measured by Google Insights. At that time the success was partly due to the fact that several media like Vice, Jayisgames or Kotaku enjoyed the "simple" and "fun" concept of Incredibox, while others praised the innovative and creative approach of the interface: Slate's Forrest Wickman wrote that Incredibox was "wonderfully surreal", and in the meantime on Gizmodo Eliot Van Buskirk said that "as a demonstration of outside the box thinking about how to promote a song, Incredibox is impressive". During the BBC technology show Click on November 17, 2012, Kate Russell described Incredibox as a "brilliant browser sequencer" and explained that users "don’t need to be a musical genius, as it’s pretty much impossible to make something that sounds bad".

Since 2016 and the mobile app release, Incredibox seemed to be also appreciated by parents and teachers who found the game concept to be an educative way to promote creativity and experimentation by allowing children to explore a less conventional form of music. In an app selection of the HuffPost, Shira Lee Katz said that "kids are encouraged to experiment freely" and Polly Conway explained on Common Sense Media that Incredibox appeared to be a "fun" app to play around with, but that it was "teaching music and composition skills at the same time". In June 2018 Incredibox was awarded by AASL (American Association of School Librarians) as one of the "Best Apps for Teaching & Learning" during the ALA annual conference in New Orleans.

Partnerships 
In July 2014, Incredibox made a partnership with AXE to promote the AXE Boat Festival in France by creating an exclusive version of the game entitled Mix For Peace. Most of the element designs, and sounds from the campaign were later reused and turned into the fourth version, The Love.

In March 2017, Incredibox made another partnership with M&M's by creating a version of the game entitled Bite-Size Beats. This version featured the M&M's spokescandies (Red, Yellow, Blue, Green, Orange and Brown) singing beatbox sound loops based on how users arrange them on screen, then the brand aired user-generated beats as TV commercials. In August, they extended the partnership with the singer Jessie J to unveil the song "Real Deal" from her fourth album, R.O.S.E.. After finding a combo, fans were able to unlock a snippet of the song as an animated bonus made like a short video clip featuring Jessie J, Red, Yellow and Incredibox's avatar. The advertising campaign was later nominated for the 2018 Webby Awards in the mobile-campaigns category.

Awards 
 Digital Ehon Award (Digital expressions for children) - 2020 Grand Prize - March 2010.
AASL (American Association of School Librarians) - 2018 Best Apps for Teaching & Learning - June 2018.
The FWA (Favorite Website Awards) - Mobile of the day - May 2016.
 The Shenzen Design Awards for Young Talents - Merit Award - September 2013.
The Lovie Awards - Bronze Award (Weird/Experimental) and People's Lovie Award - November 2010.
 The Dope Awards - Web Award - September 2009.
The Design Licks - Website of the day - September 2009.
 The FWA (Favorite Website Awards) - Website of the day - September 2009.

References

External links 
 
So Far So Good company website

2009 video games
Flash games
Mobile games
IOS games
Music video games
Single-player video games
Android (operating system) games
MacOS games
Windows games
Browser games
Video games developed in France